Claudio Vico (died 1599) was a Roman Catholic prelate who served as Bishop of Strongoli (1590–1599).

Biography
On 21 Mar 1590, Claudio Vico was appointed by Pope Gregory XIII as Bishop of Strongoli.
He served as Bishop of Strongoli until his death in 1599.

References

External links and additional sources
 (for Chronology of Bishops) 
 (for Chronology of Bishops) 

16th-century Italian Roman Catholic bishops
1599 deaths
Bishops appointed by Pope Gregory XIII
Year of birth unknown
Place of birth missing